The Battle of Ad Decimum took place on September 13, 533 between the armies of the Vandals, commanded by King Gelimer, and the Byzantine Empire, under the command of General Belisarius. This event and events in the following year are sometimes jointly referred to as the Battle of Carthage, one of several battles to bear that name. The Byzantine victory marked the beginning of the end for the Vandals and began the reconquest of the west under the Emperor Justinian I.

Battle

Prelude
The Vandal Kingdom in North Africa was ruled by King Hilderic. His reign was noteworthy for the kingdom's excellent relations with the Byzantine Empire ruled by Emperor Justinian I. Procopius writes that he was "a very particular friend and guest-friend of Justinian, who had not yet come to the throne", noting that Hilderic and Justinian exchanged large presents of money to each other. Hilderic allowed a new Chalcedonian bishop to take office in the Vandal capital of Carthage, and many Vandals began to convert to the Chalcedonians, to the alarm of the Vandal nobility. Hilderic rejected the Arian Christianity that most Vandals followed. However, in 531, Hilderic was overthrown by his cousin Gelimer, a popular military commander who had commanded successfully against the Moors. Gelimer began persecuting the non-Arian population, and many fled to the Byzantine Empire. Justinian sent Byzantine general Belisarius to reconquer the former Roman province of North Africa. On Midsummer Day 533 the expedition set off. It consisted of 5,000 Byzantine cavalry and twice as many infantry and some additional units but their number and composition is not named by the primary sources. They travelled in a fleet of 500 transports, escorted by ninety-two dromons. Once the fleet arrived safely in North Africa, the Byzantine army disembarked and marched up the coast to Carthage, the Vandal capital, the ships keeping pace with the army offshore. Contact with the fleet was lost however when it had to sail round Cape Bon.

Preparation
Ad Decimum (Latin for "at the tenth [mile post]"), was a marker along the Mediterranean coast road ten Roman miles south of Carthage. Hearing of the Byzantine landing, Gelimer marched north from his position towards Ad Decimum. He divided his forces, sending 2,000 men under his nephew Gibamund to block one of the three roads to Carthage, the other two converging at Ad Decimum.

Gelimer retained 5,000–6,000 men under his own command while his brother Ammatus approached from the north with 6,000–7,000 troops, Ammatus scouting ahead of his troops in person. At Ad Decimum there was a narrow defile where the Byzantines could be trapped. The Byzantines did not know the layout of the road network and would probably be surprised if an army appeared behind them. When the Byzantines advanced towards Carthage they would most likely try to go through the path blocked by Gibamund who was ordered to charge them. This was supposed to push the Byzantines back into the valley and disorganise them. Gelimer would advance into the valley and attack them from behind.

When Belisarius landed in North Africa he knew the Vandals would move against him before he could reach Carthage. However he did not know the Vandal dispositions so he wanted to gain intelligence about them before giving battle. At the time when Ammatus was scouting the location of the battle, Belisarius found a good spot for a fortified camp roughly four miles from Ad Decimum, leaving his infantry there while he advanced with his cavalry. Belisarius had not ordered the 300-strong contingent of scouts under John the Armenian, or the 600 Huns guarding his left flank to stop so they kept advancing while Belisarius was still with his encamping infantry.

Battle
The battle started with two roughly simultaneous engagements between smaller Vandal and Byzantine units. 

One of these was between the Byzantine Hun mercenaries and the Vandals of Gibamundus. One of the roughly 600 Huns rode out in front of the rest when encountering the Vandals. Upon seeing this the Vandals stopped in their tracks allowing the Huns to charge and disperse them. They possibly did this because of fear of a trap, being stunned at the bravery of this Hun or being surprised upon seeing Byzantines so far away from the main road. They were also possibly scared of the Huns due to their reputation as great warriors. Thus the 600 Hun mercenaries defeated 2,000 Vandals and killed Gibamundus in combat.

At roughly the same time Ammatas made an error that would cost him his life. Ammatas was scouting the battlefield with just a few men when he encountered the much stronger Byzantine vanguard under John, being killed in the ensuing combat. The rest of Ammatas' forces moved out of Carthage in small bands of at most thirty men, thinly stretching themselves over the road between Carthage and the battlefield. When these encountered the Byzantines they quickly fled.

By now a Byzantine contingent under a man called Solomon, sent to contact John, reached the scene where battle had taken place. They questioned local inhabitants to what took place there. Soon after Gelimer’s main force came into sight, Solomon promptly informed Belisarius of the situation. Seeing the importance of a nearby hill, an ideal location for a camp, some of Gelimer’s and Solomon’s troops began to skirmish. The Byzantines had to attack uphill and against superior numbers quickly leading to defeat. The retreating Byzantines encountered 800 more Byzantine troops and reformed. Upon being informed of the current situation however, these 800 fled to the safety of Belisarius’ main force. Reforming these troops and listening to their reports, Belisarius noticed that many Vandals had already been routed while the rest had halted. Rightly believing he outnumbered the Vandals Belisarius moved rapidly on Ad Decimum. Procopius believed that if Gelimer had pursued the fleeing Byzantines he would have completely overrun Belisarius' unsuspecting contingent, while if he would have moved towards Carthage he would have cut the Byzantine army off from John’s advance guard. The second option would have put Gelimer in a position to attack the weaker and unsuspecting Byzantine fleet from Carthage, and either outcome could have been disastrous for the Byzantines. Seeing only a few dead troops around the body of his brother Ammatas, Gelimer became convinced that the Byzantine troops led by Solomon had been only a small rear guard, and that an overwhelming attack by a much larger force earlier in the battle had forced Ammatas' troops to abandon their fallen commander.   In the clear space around Carthage the Vandals would not have had surprise on their side and the outcome of engagement would be more in doubt, and as such he did not try to pursue the “overwhelming” Byzantine force. Instead, Gelimer elected to set up camp at the favorable position he had captured, gather intelligence, and wait for reinforcements from Sardinia to arrive rather than engage Belisarius (at this point still extremely vulnerable), who moved towards Carthage.

When Belisarius attacked the unprepared Vandals from an unexpected direction, he quickly routed the Vandals who had fled away from Carthage in order to avoid being trapped between Belisarius and a potential other Byzantine force (one under John indeed being present on that road). 

After this battle Carthage was left relatively lightly defended and was captured by the Byzantines.

Aftermath
Belisarius camped near the site of the battle, not wanting to be too close to the city at night. The next day he marched on the city, with his wife 
Antonina at his side, ordering his men not to kill or enslave the population (as was normal practice at the time) because he stated the people were actually Roman citizens under Vandal rule. They found the gates to the city open, and the army was generally welcomed. Belisarius went straight to the palace and sat on the throne of the Vandal King. He then set about rebuilding the fortifications of the city, and his fleet sought shelter in the Lake of Tunis, five miles (8 km) south of Carthage.

After a second defeat at the Battle of Tricamarum later in the year, the Vandal Kingdom was all but ended.

Notes

References

Further reading
 Lord Mahon Philip Henry Stanhope, 5th Earl Stanhope, The Life of Belisarius, 1848. Reprinted 2006 (unabridged with editorial comments) Evolution Publishing, . 

Ad Decimum
Ad Decimum
530s conflicts
Military history of Tunisia
530s in the Byzantine Empire
Vandalic War
533